The 1866 Grand National was the 28th renewal of the Grand National horse race that took place at Aintree near Liverpool, England, on 7 March 1866.

The winning jockey, Alec Goodman, had also ridden the 1852 winner.

Finishing Order

Non-finishers

References

 1866
Grand National
Grand National
19th century in Lancashire
March 1866 sports events